Group Captain William Neil McKechnie, GC (27 August 1907 – 30 August 1944) was a pilot and senior commander in the Royal Air Force. He was awarded the Empire Gallantry Medal in 1929, which was exchanged for the George Cross in 1940. He was killed in action over Germany in 1944.

Early life
William Neil McKechnie was born on 27 August 1907 in Kasauli, India, the son of Lieutenant Colonel William Ernest McKechnie, Indian Medical Service, and Marion A. McKechnie. He attended The Perse School in Cambridge.

McKechnie later married Mary Roma Doig of Musselburgh, Midlothian.

Empire Gallantry Medal
McKechnie earned the Empire Gallantry Medal for an act of bravery in saving Flight Cadet C. J. Giles after an aeroplane crash on 20 June 1929 while still a flight cadet aged 22.

The London Gazette of 18 October 1929, gives the following details in announcing the award to Group Captain McKechnie of the Empire Gallantry Medal:

McKechnie's Empire Gallantry Medal was exchanged for the George Cross in 1940.

RAF career
McKechnie attended RAF College Cranwell.

In January 1939, he was commanding No. 27 Squadron RAF at Kohat, India.

During the Second World War, McKechnie was a group captain based at RAF Metheringham with No. 106 Squadron RAF from 11 November 1943 until his death. He was involved in the Battle of Berlin in which he flew in an Avro Lancaster that completed thirteen operations against Berlin and four other operations over Germany, when the plane was lost it had flown 638.05 hours.
Their eighteenth, and final flight, on 29 August 1944, was an operation over Königsberg where No. 106 Squadron lost two planes, including McKechnie's, without a trace. The Commonwealth War Graves Commission lists McKechnie's date of death as 30 August 1944.

Those killed in action were:
G/C W.N.McKechnie GC
Sgt R.B.Clarke
F/S H.W.T.Carter RCAF
F/O E.E.Fletcher
Sgt C.C.Jeffrey
Sgt D.Forster
F/S E.L.Collins

There is no known grave for McKechnie or any members of his crew, but they are commemorated on Runnymede Memorial panel 200, Surrey.

References

1907 births
1944 deaths
People educated at The Perse School
Royal Air Force group captains
Recipients of the Empire Gallantry Medal
British World War II pilots
British World War II bomber pilots
Aviators killed by being shot down
Royal Air Force personnel killed in World War II
Scottish airmen